Acetoxyketobemidone (O-Acetylketobemidone) is an opioid analgesic that is an acetylated derivative of ketobemidone. It was developed in the 1950s during research into analogues of pethidine and was assessed by the United Nations Office on Drugs and Crime but was not included on the list of drugs under international control, probably because it was not used in medicine or widely available. Nevertheless, acetoxyketobemidone is controlled as an ester of ketobemidone, which is included in Schedule I of the Single Convention on Narcotic Drugs of 1961.

Presumably acetoxyketobemidone produces similar effects to ketobemidone and other opioids, such as analgesia and sedation, along with side effects such as nausea, itching, vomiting and respiratory depression which may be harmful or fatal.

References 

 UNODC Bulletin on Narcotics 1954

Synthetic opioids
4-Phenylpiperidines
Ketones
Phenol esters
Acetate esters
Mu-opioid receptor agonists